The American Airpower Museum is an aviation museum located on the former site of Republic Aviation at Republic Airport in East Farmingdale, New York. It maintains a collection of aviation artifacts and an array of aircraft spanning the many years of the aircraft factory's history.

The museum has many static displays which include a Republic F-84 first generation jet fighter, a rare example of the swept-wing RF-84F reconnaissance variant, and a Republic F-105 Thunderchief. The last production aircraft was the Fairchild Republic A-10 Thunderbolt II.

The museum has a group of volunteers which includes both former Republic workers and veterans of all branches of the military. A flight experience is available on board a C-47 aircraft which actually flew during the Normandy invasion on D-Day.

History
The museum was originally established in 1998 as the American Museum for the Preservation of Historic Aircraft. It was founded by Jeff Clyman with a $250,000 grant from the state.

For several years the Federal Aviation Administration (FAA) had been pursuing a $10.6 million plan to tear down the  hangar built around 1940 and replace it with a safety apron at the end of a north-south runway to provide more room for emergency stops. In March 2011 Democrats Charles Schumer and Steve Israel said that the FAA stated it was not necessary for the hangar to be torn down, but if it were, federal money could be used to help relocate the hangar to a proposed location farther south along New Highway.

Aircraft on display

 Aero L-39C Albatros 4605
 Aero L-39ZA Albatros 2424
 Cessna 337B Super Skymaster 3370586
 Consolidated PBY-6A Catalina 64072
 Curtiss Kittyhawk III 845
 Douglas C-47B Skytrain 44-76717
 Fairchild Republic A-10A Thunderbolt II 80-0247
 General Dynamics F-111A Aardvark 67-0047
 Goodyear FG-1D Corsair 67089
 Grumman TBM-3E Avenger 85886
 North American AT-6D Texan 49-3829
 North American AT-28D Trojan 49-1496 – On loan
 North American B-25 Mitchell 40-2168 Miss Hap
 North American P-51D Mustang 44-63542 Jacqueline
 North American P-51D Mustang – Replica
 North American SNJ-5 Texan
 Northrop Grumman EA-6B Prowler 162938
 Piper PA-32 32-272
 Republic F-84E Thunderjet 49-2348
 Republic F-84F Thunderstreak 51-9480
 Republic RF-84F Thunderflash 53-7595
 Republic P-47D Thunderbolt 44-90447 Jacky's Revenge – Crashed in Hudson River 27 May 2016, pilot killed. Wreckage recovered.
 Republic F-105D Thunderchief 62-4361
 RotorWay Scorpion Too N8PA
 Waco UPF-7 N32006

See also
 List of aerospace museums

References

External links

 American Airpower Museum - Official site

Aerospace museums in New York (state)
Museums in Suffolk County, New York
Military and war museums in New York (state)
World War II museums in the United States